SM Station is a digital music project by South Korean record label SM Entertainment. It undertook to release one digital single every Friday starting from February 3, 2016. The project's first season ended on February 3, 2017, with 52 songs. Its second season began on March 31, 2017, and concluded on April 6, 2018, with a total of 57 songs.

History
SM Station's purpose was to showcase SM Entertainment's artists and producers, while also including collaborations with artists outside of the label. The project began on February 3, 2016, with the release of its first single "Rain" by Taeyeon. The song proved successful, topping the South Korean Gaon Digital Chart and winning first place on the weekly music show Inkigayo. Subsequent singles that entered top 10 on the Gaon Digital Chart include "Spring Love" by Wendy and Eric Nam, "The Day" by Baekhyun and K.Will, "No Matter What" by BoA and Beenzino, "Dancing King" by Exo and Yoo Jae-suk, "Always in My Heart" by Joy and Seulong, and "Sweet Dream" by Kim Hee-chul and Min Kyung-hoon. "Rain" and "Spring Love" received various nominations at year-end music awards, among which "Rain" won a Digital Bonsang at the 31st Golden Disk Awards and "Sweet Dream" won a Best Rock Song at the MelOn Music Awards. The first season ended on February 3, 2017, with the 52nd single "Curtain" by Suho.

Station's second season was to feature collaborations with foreign musicians, besides past projects. It began on March 31, 2017, with the first single "Would U" by Red Velvet. On April 6, 2017, SM Entertainment released a compilation album titled SM Station Season 1 which contains the first season's 52 singles and five bonus tracks. The second season concluded on April 6, 2018, with "New Heroes" by NCT member Ten.

In August 2018, SM Entertainment announced a special season titled Station X 0 (Station Young), in collaboration with SK telecom's 0 (Young) mobile brand. According to the label, Station X 0 is a cultural project for the young generation. The season ended on October 19, 2018, with "Written in the Stars" by Wendy and John Legend. A project girl group, Station Young, consisting of Red Velvet's Seulgi, (G)I-dle's Soyeon, GFriend's SinB and soloist Chungha was formed for the single "Wow Thing" for the album.

A third season was announced in November 2018. The first single would be released by Lucas and Jonah Nilsson of Swedish band Dirty Loops. The season ended with "Long Flight" by Taeyong, released on July 18, 2019.

On November 15, 2019, SM Entertainment uploaded a trailer featuring Jaehyun, announcing the fourth season titled Station X. The season began on November 20 with a collaboration single with UNICEF "This is Your Day (for every child, UNICEF)", by BoA, Siwon, J-Min, Sunny, Taemin, Suho, Wendy, and Doyoung.

On July 27, 2020, SM Entertainment announced a special project titled Our Beloved BoA featuring covers of BoA's top hits to commemorate the 20th anniversary of her debut. It began on July 31, with the first single "Garden in the Air" by Baekhyun, from BoA's fifth Korean studio album Girls on Top.

On 6 April 2021, SM Entertainment released Tomorrow by Chanyeol. He participated in the writing of the song.

NCT Lab 
On January 28, 2022, SM Entertainment announced a special project titled NCT Lab, which will feature solo or unit songs made by NCT members. It began on February 4, with the release of Mark's first single, "Child". The second single, "Conextion (Age of Light)", sung by Doyoung, Mark and Haechan, was released on March 20 as a collaboration with the Ministry of Culture, Sports and Tourism and the Korea Creative Content Agency, who used it as the theme song for their "Gwanghwa Era" project. It features modern instruments and traditional Korean instruments including the gayageum, janggu, taepyeongso and gong. The performance video features Shotaro as a dancer.

Discography 

Seasons
 SM Station Season 1 (2016–2017)
 SM Station Season 2 (2017–2018)
 SM Station X 0 (2018)
 SM Station Season 3 (2018–2019)
 SM Station X 4 LOVEs for Winter (2019)
 SM Station Season 4 (2020–2023)
 Our Beloved BoA (2020)
 MV Remastering Project (2021-2023)
 NCT Lab (2022)

Awards and nominations

Concert shows 

 "The Station" (2018), a music talk concert with various artists from SM '#STATION'.

Notes

References

External links 
 Official website
 http://smstation0.smtown.com

SM Town
SM Entertainment
2016 establishments in South Korea